Royal Consort Sugui Kim (숙의 김씨) may refer to:
 Royal Consort Sugui Kim (Cheoljong)
 Royal Consort Sugui Kim (Danjong)
 Royal Consort Sugui Kim (Heonjong)
 Royal Consort Sugui Kim (Hyojong)
 Royal Consort Sugui Kim (Jungjong)
 Royal Consort Sugui Kim (Seongjong)